Caseolus consors is a species of small air-breathing land snails, terrestrial pulmonate gastropod mollusks in the family Geomitridae. This species is endemic to Porto Santo Island, Portugal.

References

Endemic fauna of Madeira
Molluscs of Europe
consors
Gastropods described in 1831
Taxonomy articles created by Polbot